Anthonij is a given name. Notable people with that name include the following

Anthonij Ewoud Jan Bertling (1860 – 1945), Dutch politician
Anthonij Guépin (1897 – 1964), Dutch sailor
Anthonij Rudolf Mauve, known as Anton Mauve (1838 – 1888), Dutch realist painter

See also

Anthoni, name
Anthonie, given name
Anthonio (disambiguation)